This is a list of major (land) battles and operations fought by Sweden between 1521 and 1814:

 The Swedish War of Liberation or Befrielsekriget (1521–1523)
 Battle of Brunnbäck Ferry (first half of April 1521)
 Battle of Västerås (April 29, 1521)
 Conquest of Kalmar (May 27, 1523)
 Conquest of Stockholm (June 16–17, 1523)
 The Danish Count Feud or Danska Grevefejden (1534–1536)
 Conquest of Halmstad (October 31, 1534)
 Battle of Helsingborg (January, 1535)
 The Russo-Swedish War (1554–57) or Stora ryska kriget (1554–1557)
 Battle of Kivinäbb (March 11, 1555)
 Assault of Nöteborg (September 15–29, 1555)
 Assault of Viborg (January 21–25, 1556)
 The Northern Seven Years' War or Nordiska sjuårskriget (1563–1570)
 Capitulation of Älvsborg (September 4, 1563)
 Battle of Marred (November 9, 1563)
 Conquest of Pernau (June 9, 1565)
 Battle of Obermühlenberg (August 15, 1565)
 Conquest of Varberg (August 28, 1565)
 Battle of Axtorna (October 20, 1565)
 Battle of Runafer (February 3, 1567)
 Fall of Pernau (June 9, 1565)
 Capitulation of Varberg (December 4, 1569)
 The Livonian War or Första polska kriget (1563–1568)
 Fall of Pernau (June 9, 1565)
 Battle of Obermühlenberg (August 15, 1565)
 Battle of Runafer (February 3, 1567)
 Conquest of Sonnenburg (August 11, 1568)
 The Russian Twenty-five Years' War or 25-årskriget mot Ryssland (1570–1595)
 Battle of Ubagall (March, 1571)
 Conquest of Weissenstein (January 1, 1573)
 Battle of Lode (January 23, 1573)
 Battle of Wenden (October 21, 1578)
 Conquest of Kexholm (November 4, 1580)
 Conquest of Narva (September 6, 1581)
 The War against Sigismund or Kriget mot Sigismund (1598–1599)
 Battle of Stegeborg (September 8, 1598)
 Battle of Stångebro (September 25, 1598)
 The Polish War or Andra polska kriget (1600–1629)
 Battle of Kokenhausen (June 17, 1601)
 Battle of Weissenstein (September 15, 1604)
 Battle of Kircholm (September 17, 1605)
 Conquest of Riga (September 15, 1621)
 Battle of Wallhof (January 8, 1626)
 Battle of Mewe (September 21, 1626)
 Battle of Hammerstein (April 13, 1627)
 Battle of Dirschau (August 8, 1627)
 Battle of Danzig (June 16, 1628)
 Battle of Osterode (October 14, 1628)
 Battle of Gurzno (February 2, 1629)
 The De la Gardie Campaign or De la Gardieska fälttåget (1609–1610)
 Battle of Kamenka (May 15, 1609)
 Battle of Torzhok (June 17, 1609)
 Battle of Tver (July 13, 1609)
 Battle of Tver (July 15, 1609)
 Battle of Kaljazin (August 18, 1609)
 Battle of Troitsko (October 28, 1609)
 Battle of Rzjov (April, 1610)
 Battle of Klusina (June 24, 1610)
 The Ingrian War or Ingermanländska kriget (1610–1617)
 Conquest of Novgorod (July 15, 1611)
 Battle of Bronnicy (July 14, 1614)
 Assault of Pskov (October 9, 1615)
 The Kalmar War or Kalmarkriget (1611–1613)
 Conquest of Kalmar slott (August 3, 1611)
 Conquest of Älvsborg (May 24, 1612)
 The Thirty Years' War or Trettioåriga kriget (1630–1648)
 Siege of Stralsund (1628)
 Conquest and occupation of Pomerania (1630)
 Battle of Marwitz (December 25, 1630)
 Battle of Frankfurt an der Oder (April 3, 1631)
 Conquest of Magdeburg (May 10, 1631)
 Battle of Breitenfeld (September 7, 1631)
 Battle of Rain (April 5, 1632)
 Battle of Nürnberg (August 24, 1632)
 Battle of Lützen (November 6, 1632)
 Battle of Oldendorf (June 28, 1633)
 Battle of Pfaffenhofen (August 1, 1633)
 Battle of Steinau (September 27, 1633)
 Battle of Nördlingen (August 27, 1634)
 Battle of Dömitz (October 22, 1635)
 Battle of Wittstock (September 24, 1636)
 Battle of Chemnitz (April 4, 1639)
 Battle of Wolfenbüttel (June 19, 1641)
 Battle of Schweidnitz (May 21, 1642)
 Battle of Breitenfeld (October 23, 1642)
 Battle of Jüterbog (November 23, 1644)
 Sack of Magdeburg (December 23, 1644)
 Battle of Jankau (February 23, 1645)
 Battle of Zusmarshausen (May 7, 1648)
 The Torstenson War or Torstensonkriget (1643–1645)
 Battle of Kolding (January 9, 1644)
 Battle of Colberger Heide (July 1, 1644)
 Battle of Fehmarn (October 13, 1644)
 Battle on the frozen Bysjö (December 22, 1644)
 The First Bremian War or Första bremiska kriget (1654)
 No major battles
 The Northern Wars or Nordiska krigen (1655–1661)
 Battle of Sobota (August 23, 1655)
 Battle of Żarnów (September 6, 1655)
 Battle of Nowy Dwór (September 20, 1655)
 Battle of Wojnicz (September 23, 1655)
 Battle of Radom (February 2, 1656)
 Battle of Golomb (February 8, 1656)
 Battle of Warka (March 28, 1656)
 Battle of Gnesen (April 27, 1656)
 Battle of Warszawa (June 18–20, 1656)
 Battle of Rautu kyrka (July, 1656)
 Battle of Lyck (September 28, 1656)
 Battle of Filippovo (October 12, 1656)
 Battle of Chojnice (December 23, 1656)
 Battle of Walk (July 8, 1657)
 Battle of Ängelholm (July 18, 1657)
 Assault of Lava (August 1, 1657)
 Battle of Genevadsbro (August 31, 1657)
 Battle of Hjärtum (September 25, 1657)
 Battle of Kattarp (October 3, 1657)
 Conquest of Fredriksodde (October 24, 1657)
 Battle of Tybrindvig (January 30, 1658)
 March Across the Belts (January 30-February 10, 1658)
 Conquest of Kronborg (September 6, 1658)
 Assault on Copenhagen (February 11, 1659)
 Battle of Nyborg (November 14, 1659)
 The Second Bremian War or Andra bremiska kriget (1666)
 No major battles
 The Scanian War or Skånska kriget (1674–1679)
 Battle of Rathenow (June 15, 1675)
 Battle of Fehrbellin (June 18, 1675)
 Battle of Halmstad (August 17, 1676)
 Battle of Lund (December 4, 1676)
 Battle of Landskrona (July 14, 1677)
 Battle of Warksow (January 8, 1678)
 Battle of Uddevalla (August 28, 1678)
 Great Sleigh Drive (winter 1678)
 The Great Northern War or Stora nordiska kriget (1700–1721)
 Battle of Pühhajoggi (November 17, 1700)
 Battle of Narva (November 20, 1700)
 Crossing of Daugava (July 9, 1701)
 Battle of Rauge (September 5, 1701)
 Battle of Erastfer (December 30, 1701)
 Battle of Kliszów (July 9, 1702)
 Battle of Hummelshof (July 19, 1702)
 Battle of Saladen (March 19, 1703)
 Battle of Pułtusk (April 21, 1703)
 Battle of Systerbäck (July 9, 1703)
 Battle of Wesenberg (June 16, 1704)
 Battle of Jakobstadt (July 26, 1704)
 Battle of Posen (Poznań) (August 9, 1704)
 Battle of Punitz (October 28, 1704)
 Battle of Gemäuerthof (July 16, 1705)
 Battle of Rakowitz (July 21, 1705)
 Battle of Fraustadt (February 3, 1706)
 Battle of Kalisz (October 19, 1706)
 Battle of Holowczyn (July 4, 1708)
 Battle of Lesnaya (September 29, 1708)
 Battle of Poltava (June 28, 1709)
 Battle of Helsingborg (February 28, 1710)
 Battle of Gadebusch (December 9, 1712)
 Battle of Pälkäne (October 6, 1713)
 Battle of Storkyro (February 19, 1714)
 Battle of Stäket (August 13, 1719)
 The Russo-Swedish War  or Hattarnas ryska krig (1741–1743)
 Battle of Villmanstrand (August 23, 1741)
 The Seven Years' War or Pommerska kriget (1757–1762)
 Battle of Tornow (September 26, 1758)
 Battle of Fehrbellin (September 28, 1758)
 Battle of Neu Kahlen (January 2, 1759)
 Russo-Swedish War (1788–1790) or Gustav III:s ryska krig (1788–1790)
 Battle of Kvistrum (September 29, 1788)
 First Battle of Porrassalmi (June 13, 1789)
 Second Battle of Porrassalmi (June 19, 1789)
 Battle of Uttismalm (June 28, 1789)
 Battle of Kaipas (July 15, 1789)
 Battle of Parkumäki (July 21, 1789)
 Battle of Valkeala (April 29, 1790)
 Battle of Korhois (1790)
 Battle of Keltis barracker (May 19–20, 1790)
 Battle of Savitaipale (June 4, 1790)
 The Franco-Swedish War or Första kriget mot Napoleon (1805–1810)
 Skirmish of Lauenburg (April 23, 1806)
 Battle of Lübeck (November 6, 1806)
 Great Sortie of Stralsund (April 1–3, 1807)
 Battle of Belling (April 16, 1807)
 Battle of Ueckermünde (April 17, 1807)
 Battle of Dänholm (August 25, 1807)
 Battle of Stralsund (May 31, 1809)
 The Finnish War or Finska kriget (1808–1809)
 Battle of Pyhäjoki (April 16, 1808)
 Battle of Siikajoki (April 18, 1808)
 Battle of Revolax (April 27, 1808)
 Battle of Pulkkila (May 1, 1808)
 Battle of Kumlinge (May 9/10, 1808)
 Battle of Kuopio (May 12, 1808)
 Battle of Lemo (June 19–20, 1808)
 Battle of Nykarleby (June 24, 1808)
 Battle of Vaasa (June 25–26, 1808)
 Battle of Lintulaks (July 3, 1808)
 Battle of Kokonsaari (July 11, 1808)
 Battle of Lapua (July 14, 1808)
 Battle of Pälkjärvi (August 10, 1808)
 Battle of Kauhajoki (August 10, 1808)
 Battle of Alavus (August 17, 1808)
 Battle of Karstula (August 21, 1808)
 Battle of Nummijärvi (August 28, 1808)
 Battle of Lappfjärd (August 29, 1808)
 Battle of Ruona–Salmi (September 1–2, 1808)
 Battle of Jutas (September 13, 1808)
 Battle of Oravais (September 14, 1808)
 Battle of Lokalaks (September 17–18, 1808)
 Helsinki village landing (September 26–28, 1808)
 Battle of Koljonvirta (October 27, 1808)
 Åland Offensive (March 10–21, 1809
 Capitulation of Kalix (March 25, 1809)
 Battle of Skellefteå (May 15, 1809)
 Battle of Hörnefors (July 5, 1809)
 Battle of Sävar (August 19, 1809)
 Battle of Ratan (August 20, 1809)
 Battle of Piteå (August 25, 1809)
 The Dano-Swedish War of 1808–09 or Dansk-svenska kriget (1808–1809)
 Battle of Lier (April 18, 1808)
 Battle of Toverud (April 19–20, 1808)
 Battle of Rødenes (April 20–May 7, 1808)
 Battle of Trangen (April 25, 1808)
 Battle of Mobekk (May 18, 1808)
 Battle of Prestebakke (June 10, 1808)
 Battle of Berby (September 12, 1808)
 Battle of Järpen (August 16, 1808)
 The Anglo-Swedish War or Kriget mot England (1810–1812)
 No battles fought
 The Second War against Napoleon or Andra kriget mot Napoleon (1813–1814)
 Battle of Großbeeren (August 23, 1813)
 Battle of Dennewitz (September 6, 1813)
 Combat of Roßlau (September 29, 1813)
 Battle of Leipzig (October 18–19, 1813)
 Battle of Bornhöved (December 7, 1813)
 The Swedish–Norwegian War or Fälttåget mot Norge (1814)
 Invasion of Hvaler (29 July 1814)
 Battle of Tistedalen (August 1, 1814)
 Battle of Lier (August 2, 1814)
 Battle of Matrand (August 5, 1814)
 Battle of Rakkestad (August 6, 1814)
 Battle of Langnes (August 9, 1814)
 Battle of Kjølberg Bridge (August 14, 1814)

References 
Print

 Sundberg, Ulf (1998). Svenska krig 1521-1814. Stockholm: Hjalmarson & Högberg. 
 Wild, Uwe. Das vergessene Gefecht der Schweden, Rosslau 1813. http://www.schweden-kavallerie.de/Fakten/Gefecht1813Rosslau.html

Sweden

Battles